Palmer is a colonia and census-designated place (CDP) in Cameron County, Texas, United States. It was first listed as a CDP prior to the 2020 census.

It is in the southern part of the county, bordered to the west by San Benito, to the northeast by Brownsville, to the east by Rice Tracts, to the south by Encantada-Ranchito-El Calaboz, and to the southwest by La Paloma.

The Resaca del Rancho Viejo, a southeast-flowing tributary of the Rio Grande, flows through the northern part of the community.

References 

Populated places in Cameron County, Texas
Census-designated places in Cameron County, Texas
Census-designated places in Texas